The Panthéon club was a French revolutionary political club founded in Paris the 6 November 1795. Its official name was Reunion of Friends of the Republic (Réunion des Amis de la République). It was composed of former terrorists and unconditional Jacobins coming from the petite bourgeoisie.

The club met on the Montagne Sainte-Geneviève, in the former royal Abbey of St Genevieve, near the Panthéon, now Lycée Henri-IV.

Among the founders was René Lebois, printer and journalist of the Orateur plébéien, maybe a Barras agent. The club was attended by those who wanted to redirect the Directory policy toward the left in the way of the defeat of the 13 Vendémiaire royalist insurrection. However, the politics of the club were initially rather moderate and respectful of legality in refusing to receive the ineligible National Convention members.

But the club soon attracted a number of former Montagnards, including Jean-Pierre-André Amar and Pierre Joseph Duhem, former members of the Committee of General Security, Pierre-Antoine Antonelle, Sylvain Maréchal, Restif de La Bretonne, Jean-Nicolas Pache, and Robert Lindet, as well as Philippe Buonarroti, a Babeuf friend, who moved the club in the direction of radical republicanism.

Membership in the club grew rapidly: from 934 members the 29 November 1795, its meetings attracted about 2400 people in February 1796.

Several members of the club, defeated in the National Convention election, as well as terrorists like Augustin Darthé, former prosecutor for the Revolutionary Tribunal, nurtured the ambition of transforming the club. They wanted the government to give up the Constitution of the Year III of 1795 to go back to the more radical Constitution of 1793. Although not member of the club, Gracchus Babeuf was one of the key speakers and developed his equality doctrine viewed as essential elements for communism.

Fearing that the club might disturb law and public order and even its own legitimacy, the Directory ordered its dissolution, and on 27 February 1796 the Général Bonaparte, commanding the Army of the Interior, carried out the orders.

The leaders of the Club would subsequently form the core of Babeuf's Conspiracy of the Equals.

Notes

References

Sources

Groups of the French Revolution